Anno Domini designates years since the traditional date of the birth of Jesus Christ.

Anno Domini may also refer to:

Anno Domini High Definition, 2009 album by Polish band Riverside
Anno Domini (Mobile Suit Gundam 00), timeline used in Anime television series
Anno Domini (NSW band), an Australian Symphonic Black/Death Metal band
Anno Domini 2000, or, Woman's Destiny, an 1889 science fiction novel by Julius Vogel
Anno Domini MCMXXI, a poetry collection of Anna Akhmatova, published in 1921